Kellie may refer to:

Surname
James M. Kellie (1848–1927), Canadian miner and political figure 
Mike Kellie (1947–2017), English drummer with Spooky Tooth and The Only Ones
J. D. Kellie-MacCallum (1845–1932), British police officer, Chief Constable of Northamptonshire County Constabulary

Given name
Kellie Abrams (born 1978), Australian professional basketball player
Kellie Bright (born 1976), English actress
Kellie Casey (born 1965), Canadian alpine skier 
Kellie Coffey (born 1971), American country musician
Kellie Crawford (born 1974), Australian entertainer
Kellie Harper (born 1977), American basketball coach
Kellie Leitch (born 1970), Canadian politician
Kellie-Ann Leyland (born 1986), English-born Northern Irish footballer
Kellie Lightbourn  (born 1974), American model 
Kellie Lim, disabled activist and student
Kellie Loder (born 1988), Canadian musician
Kellie Magnus (born 1970), Jamaican author and journalist
Kellie Maloney (born 1953, previously known as Frank Maloney), boxing manager and promoter
Kellie Martin (born 1975), American actress 
Kellie McMillan (born 1977), Australian swimmer 
Kellie Pickler (born 1986), American country musician and television personality
Kellie Shirley (born 1983), British actress
Kellie Sloane (born 1973), Australian journalist
Kellie Suttle (born 1973), American track and field athlete
Kellie Waymire (1967–2003), American actress
Kellie Wells (athlete) (born 1982), American track and field athlete
Kellie Wells (writer), American author and academic
Kellie While (born 1976), British singer-songwriter
Kellie Shanygne Williams (born 1976), American actress

Other 
Earl of Kellie, title of Scottish peers
Kellie Castle, Scottish castle
Kellie's Castle, a building near Ipoh in Malaysia
MV Kellie Chouest, Deep Submergence Elevator Support Ship

See also
Kelly (disambiguation)
Kelley (disambiguation)
Kelli (disambiguation)

Disambiguation pages with given-name-holder lists